Bo Niklas Hult (born 13 February 1990) is a Swedish professional footballer who plays as a left back for IF Elfsborg.

Club career

Nice
In May 2014 Niklas Hult was signed by OGC Nice for a fee around €1 million, the French Ligue 1 club as they looked to strengthen for the 2014–15 season. He was described as a midfield workhorse with attacking and defensive qualities.

Panathinaikos
On 30 June 2016, he signed a three-years contract with Greek Super League club Panathinaikos for a transfer fee of €300,000. His contract, which ran until 2019, was worth €250,000 per year.

During the summer of 2017, the Swedish international rejected a suggestion from Standard Liège, and at the same time he filed an appeal claiming his late payment from Panathinaikos. Later in the summer, the player's side claimed that the international left-back could leave as free from the club, either for Konyaspor or Standard Liège that was once again interested in his acquisition. Hult had no trouble withdrawing his appeal as long as he had a raise in his annual salary and extending his contract for another year. The greens put all the odds down, and as they figured that the player was one of the best player in the roster, on 21 July 2017, took the decision to table a new proposal for co-operation and increase his annual earnings by more than €100,000 while expanding his contract by 2020, that make the player's side to respond positively. Unfortunately during the 2017–18 season the financial problems of the club remained unresolved with Hult reportedly looking his next step in his career.

On 30 January 2018, after his first appeal, Hult took again legal actions against Panathinaikos because of the money the Greens owe to him. He had not received his December's fee and in order to ensure his money decided to sue financially struggling greens. Nevertheless, between two sides there are negotiations in order to find a mutual solution and Panathinaikos receive money from his possible transfer in January's window.

AEK Athens
On 31 January 2018, Hult signed a two-and-half-year contract with rivals AEK Athens for an estimated amount of €200,000. In the 2019–20 season Hult competed in 18 matches for AEK across all competitions, with the 30-year-old Swedish having previously won the Super League two years ago after transferring from Panathinaikos in January 2018. On 30 June 2020, he mutually solved his contract with the club.

Hannover 96
On 28 August 2020, Hult signed a two-year contract with German club Hannover 96.

Return to Sweden
After his contract with Hannover expired, Hult signed a three-year contract with IF Elfsborg, where he had previously played from 2009 to 2014.

Career statistics

Club

Honours
IF Elfsborg
Allsvenskan: 2012

AEK Athens
Super League: 2017–18

References

External links

Elite Prospects profile

1990 births
Living people
People from Värnamo Municipality
Swedish footballers
Sweden youth international footballers
Sweden under-21 international footballers
Sweden international footballers
Swedish expatriate footballers
Association football defenders
Allsvenskan players
Ligue 1 players
Super League Greece players
2. Bundesliga players
IFK Värnamo players
IF Elfsborg players
OGC Nice players
Panathinaikos F.C. players
AEK Athens F.C. players
Hannover 96 players
Expatriate footballers in France
Expatriate footballers in Greece
Expatriate footballers in Germany
Sportspeople from Jönköping County